Francis Taaloga Owusu (born December 27, 1994) is a former American football wide receiver. He played college football at Stanford.

High school
Owusu attended Oaks Christian high school in California, where he was a four star prospect ranked as the No. 27 player in California, he committed to Stanford over USC, Florida and Nebraska.

College career
Owusu played as a true freshman, played in 12 games and had 2 catches for 56 yards. In his senior year, Owusu played in 11 games and had 8 catches for 113 yards and a touchdown.

Professional career

Miami Dolphins
Owusu signed with the Miami Dolphins as an undrafted free agent on May 5, 2017. He was waived/injured by the Dolphins on August 15, 2017. On August 18, 2017, he was released from injured reserve. On January 4, 2018, he signed a reserve/future contract with the Dolphins.

On September 1, 2018, Owusu was waived by the Dolphins. He was re-signed to the practice squad on November 28, 2018.

San Diego Fleet
On November 9, 2018, Owusu signed with the San Diego Fleet of the Alliance of American Football (AAF) for the 2019 season. The league ceased operations in April 2019.

Personal life
Owusu has four siblings: Chris, Brian, Michael, and Crystal. Chris was a wide receiver at Stanford from 2008-2011 and is currently a free agent in the NFL. Brian was a defensive back at Harvard and graduated in 2013. Michael is a senior in high school at Oaks Christian School and has committed to play college football at Vanderbilt. His only sister, Crystal, played women's basketball at Columbia and graduated in 2015.

References

External links
Stanford Cardinal bio

1994 births
Living people
Miami Dolphins players
Players of American football from California
Sportspeople from Oxnard, California
Stanford Cardinal football players
San Diego Fleet players